Tom Lister (born June 21, 1978) is an English actor, known for his roles as Carl King in Emmerdale from 2004 to 2012, Harry Wainwright in Heartbeat and Rob Ingram in The Bill.

Early and personal life
Lister was born as Thomas Brown, but took on his mother's maiden name when acting to avoid confusion with another actor under the name of Tom Brown. He is married to primary school headteacher Jennifer Humpage and they have two sons, Benjamin and Samuel. He is also a Christian man. He studied at Birmingham School of Acting (BSA) for three years and graduated in 2001.

Career 
Lister began his career making appearances in series including Heartbeat, Doctors and The Bill. In February 2004, he made his debut appearance on the ITV soap opera Emmerdale as Carl King, a role he maintained for eight years until his departure on 18 October 2012. Lister appeared alongside his Emmerdale co-stars Lucy Pargeter, Nick Miles, Kelsey-Beth Crossley and Nicola Wheeler as the King family in a special episode of All Star Family Fortunes, playing against Coronation Street'''s Webster family and winning. He also appeared as singer Jamie Cullum in Stars In Their Eyes.

 Stage roles 
Later in 2012, Lister appeared as Captain Hook in the Sunderland Empire pantomime, Peter Pan. He made his musical theatre debut in the world premiere of The Water Babies at the Curve in Leicester on 24 April 2014 as Grimes. In 2014, Lister toured the UK as Wild Bill Hickok in the musical Calamity Jane. A few years later, he appeared in a West End revival of 42nd Street.

Filmography
 Shifting Units (1999) (Credited as Tom Brown) as Sales Office Team Member
 Heartbeat (2002) as Harry Wainwright
 Doctors (2002) as Andy Mills
 The Bill (2002) as Rob Ingram
 Emmerdale (2004–2012) as Carl King
 Doctors (2016) as Martin Laws
 Doctors (2020–2021) as Simon RobsonWest End In Blackpool'' (2021) as Self

References

External links

1978 births
Alumni of Birmingham School of Acting
English Christians
English male television actors
Living people
Male actors from Lancashire
People from Craven District